Emily Kay (born 7 September 1995) is a track and former road cyclist. After several years representing Great Britain and England at international competitions, Kay transferred allegiance in late 2019, and began representing Ireland on the UCI World Cup Track cycling circuit. She currently rides for UCI Women's Continental Team .

Junior career
Kay partook in the 2009 School games and won the individual pursuit and finished second in the Keirin. At the 2010 national youth and junior track championships, Kay placed second in the junior points race, just three points behind Laura Trott. In addition, Kay placed second in the under 16's points race and won the under 16's individual pursuit and scratch race titles. Kay won three consecutive future stars series titles at revolution cycling series.

On 8 August 2013, at the Sir Chris Hoy Velodrome in Glasgow, Kay competed at the UCI Juniors Track World Championships. She was part of Britain's Team Pursuit squad which also included Hayley Jones, Amy Hill and Emily Nelson. In the qualifying heat, they broke the senior world record which had only been set a few weeks previously at the European Track Championships, setting a new time of 4:38.708. In the final, they broke the record once more, with a time of 4:35.085, beating Russia to become world champions.

Senior
At the 2009 Dudley Track Open Grand Prix Kay was the winner of the omnium event. Kay won the final stage at the 2012 Surf & Turf weekend to triumph overall. During the 2013 season Kay won the 2013 Hillingdon Grand Prix. At the Coupe de France Fenioux Piste which occurred just before the 2016 Olympic Games, Kay finished fourth in the Omnium. Kay then won the bronze medal at the 2016 UEC European Track Championships in the team pursuit. In November 2016 Kay joined  ahead of the 2017 season.

Major results

2010
 British National Youth Track Championships
1st  Individual pursuit
1st  Scratch
2nd Points race
 2nd Points race, British National Junior Track Championships
2011
 British National Youth Track Championships
1st  Individual pursuit
1st  Points race
1st  Scratch
3rd Sprint
 3rd Madison, British National Youth Track Championships (with Rebecca Hunt)
2012
 British National Track Championships
1st  Team pursuit
2nd Madison (with Amy Roberts)
 British National Junior Track Championships
1st  Scratch
3rd Individual pursuit
2013
 UCI Juniors Track World Championships
1st  Team pursuit (with Amy Hill, Hayley Jones and Emily Nelson)
3rd  Omnium
 British National Junior Track Championships
1st  Individual pursuit
2nd Points race
 Revolution
1st Scratch – Round 1, Manchester
2nd Scratch – Round 2, Glasgow
 3rd Madison, British National Track Championships (with Hayley Jones)
2014
 1st Scratch, Open des Nations sur Piste de Roubaix
 2nd Scratch, British National Track Championships
2015
 Revolution
1st Points race – Round 3, London
1st Scratch – Round 3, London
2nd Points race – Round 4, Glasgow
2nd Scratch – Round 5, London
2nd Scratch – Round 2, Manchester
3rd Points race – Round 2, Manchester
3rd Scratch – Round 3, Manchester
 3rd Points race, British National Track Championships
 6th London Nocturne
 7th Women's Tour de Yorkshire
2016
 2016–17 UCI Track Cycling World Cup
1st  Team pursuit, Glasgow (with Ellie Dickinson, Manon Lloyd and Emily Nelson)
1st  Omnium, Glasgow
2nd  Omnium, Apeldoorn
 UEC European Under-23 Track Championships
1st  Team pursuit (with Dannielle Khan, Manon Lloyd and Emily Nelson)
3rd  Omnium
 Grand Prix of Poland
1st Scratch
2nd Points race
 UEC European Track Championships
2nd  Madison (with Emily Nelson)
3rd  Team pursuit (with Dannielle Khan, Manon Lloyd and Emily Nelson)
 2nd Points race, Revolution Champions League, Round 1 – Manchester
 Revolution
3rd Points race, Round 1 – Manchester
3rd Points race, Round 5 – Manchester
3rd Scratch, Round 5 – Manchester
2017
 Track Cycling Challenge
1st Madison (with Manon Lloyd)
1st Points race
3rd Omnium
3rd Scratch
 2nd  Team pursuit, UEC European Track Championships
 3rd  Team pursuit, 2017–18 UCI Track Cycling World Cup, Pruszków (with Neah Evans, Emily Nelson and Manon Lloyd)
 3rd Individual pursuit, Dublin International
2018
 2018–19 UCI Track Cycling World Cup
1st  Team pursuit, Berlin
2nd  Madison, Saint-Quentin-en-Yvelines (with Neah Evans)
 2nd  Scratch, UEC European Track Championships
 British National Track Championships
2nd Points race
3rd Individual pursuit
3rd Madison (with Neah Evans)
 3rd  Scratch, Commonwealth Games
2020
 3rd  Omnium, 2019–20 UCI Track Cycling World Cup, Milton
2021
 3rd  Team pursuit, UEC European Track Championships

References

External links
 
 
 
 
 

1995 births
Living people
Irish female cyclists
English female cyclists
British track cyclists
Sportspeople from Bromsgrove
Cyclists at the 2018 Commonwealth Games
Commonwealth Games bronze medallists for England
Commonwealth Games medallists in cycling
Cyclists at the 2020 Summer Olympics
Olympic cyclists of Ireland
Medallists at the 2018 Commonwealth Games